The 2015–16 NJIT Highlanders women's basketball team will represents New Jersey Institute of Technology during the 2015–16 NCAA Division I women's basketball season. The Highlanders, led by fourth year head coach Steve Lanpher, play their home games at the Fleisher Center and were first year members of the Atlantic Sun Conference. They finished the season 4–26, 1–13 in A-Sun play to finish in last place. They lost in the quarterfinals of A-Sun Tournament to Florida Gulf Coast.

Roster

Schedule

|-
!colspan=9 style="background:#FF0000; color:#FFFFFF;"| Non-conference regular season

|-
!colspan=9 style="background:#FF0000; color:#FFFFFF;"| Atlantic Sun regular season

|-
!colspan=9 style="background:#FF0000; color:#FFFFFF;"| Atlantic Sun Women's Tournament

See also
 2015–16 NJIT Highlanders men's basketball team

References

NJIT Highlanders
NJIT Highlanders women's basketball seasons
NJIT Highlanders Women's B
NJIT Highlanders Women's B